Kjell Rune Sellin (born 1 June 1989 in Namsos) is a former Norwegian footballer.

He came to Rosenborg BK from Norwegian Second Division team Byåsen IL in August 2008. He made his debut for Rosenborg as a substitute in the 4-0 loss against Tromsø IL the same month as he arrived to the club.

1 January 2017 he signed for Sandnes Ulf.

One year later he signed for Fredrikstad.

In 2019 Sellin signed for Strømmen.

On 17 February 2021 Sellin decide to retire from professional football.

Career statistics

Club

Honours

Club
Rosenborg
Norwegian Premier League Championship (2): 2009, 2010
 Aalesund
Norwegian Football Cup (1): 2011

 Hødd
Norwegian Football Cup (1): 2012

References

1989 births
Living people
Norwegian footballers
Byåsen Toppfotball players
Rosenborg BK players
Kongsvinger IL Toppfotball players
Aalesunds FK players
IL Hødd players
Sandefjord Fotball players
Sandnes Ulf players
Fredrikstad FK players
Strømmen IF players
Eliteserien players
Norwegian First Division players
People from Namsos
Association football forwards
Association football wingers
Sportspeople from Trøndelag